This article lists the squads for the 2023 Arnold Clark Cup, the second edition of the Arnold Clark Cup. The cup consisted of a series of friendly games, and will be held in England from 16 to 22 February 2023. The four national teams involved in the tournament could register a maximum of 26 players.

The age listed for each player is on 16 February 2023, the first day of the tournament. The numbers of caps and goals listed for each player do not include any matches played after the start of tournament. The club listed is the club for which the player last played a competitive match prior to the tournament. The nationality for each club reflects the national association (not the league) to which the club is affiliated. A flag is included for coaches that are of a different nationality than their own national team.

Squads

Belgium
Coach: Ives Serneels

The final 26-player squad was announced on 6 February 2023.

England
Coach:  Sarina Wiegman

The final 26-player squad was announced on 7 February 2023. Fran Kirby withdrew from the squad due to injury on 11 February and was replaced with Jordan Nobbs.

Italy
Coach: Milena Bertolini

The final 26-player squad was announced on 8 February 2023. Marta Mascarello withdrew due to injury on 10 February and was replaced with Aurora Galli.

South Korea
Coach:  Colin Bell

The final 26-player squad was announced on 26 January 2023.

Player representation

Players
Oldest (goalkeeper):  Kim Jung-mi
Oldest (outfield):  Park Eun-sun
Youngest (goalkeeper):  Kim Keong-hee
Youngest (outfield):  Bae Ye-bin

By club
Clubs with 3 or more players represented are listed.

By club nationality

By club federation

References

Squads